A super magnum is a longer and/or more powerful version of a "magnum" cartridge. Although the term "super magnum" typically refers to a handgun cartridge, created by lengthening an existing straight-case design, it can also refer to rifle and shotgun cartridges, such as the .17 Winchester Super Magnum and the 3" 12 Gauge Super Magnum. In this case, it simply denotes that it is of greater power than existing "magnums" of similar caliber, similar to other designations such as "Remington Ultra Magnum". The most widespread of these cartridges are the "SuperMag" family of super-magnum handgun cartridges that were proposed and tested by Elgin Gates in the 1970s.

Calibers

Gates' SuperMags
Gates tested super magnum cartridges in 7mm, .357, .375, .41, .44, .45, .50, and .60 caliber. The extra powder capacity can increase muzzle velocity up to 30–40% over the original magnum rounds.

In the 1980s, Dan Wesson Firearms began to produce revolvers chambered for the .357 Supermag, .375 Supermag, and .445 SuperMag cartridges.  In 2000, they added .414 Supermag, and .460 Rowland.

Other super magnums
There have been other cartridges that were created by extending the length of existing magnum cartridges.  Some of these are:
 The .327 Federal Magnum, based on the .32 H&R Magnum.
 The .357 Remington Maximum, based on the .357 Magnum and is virtually identical in all dimensions to the .357 SuperMag, with only a slightly shorter overall case length.
 The .460 S&W Magnum, based on the .454 Casull. The latter cartridge is effectively, though not in name, a magnum version of the .45 Colt.

Details and performance

.357 SuperMag
Based on the .357 Magnum cartridge, a revolver or single-shot pistol designed for the .357 SuperMag can also fire .357 Remington Maximum, .360 Dan Wesson, .357 Magnum,  .38 Special, .38 Long Colt, and the .38 Short Colt cartridges.  The .357 SuperMag is essentially the same cartridge as the later-named .357 Remington Maximum that was jointly developed circa 1982–1983 by Sturm, Ruger & Company and Remington, the .357 Remington Maximum brass is only 0.005" shorter than that of the .357 SuperMag brass, but identical in all other dimensions. Ruger, as well as Dan Wesson, introduced revolvers in this cartridge, followed shortly later by Thompson/Center in their single-shot Contender.Due to flame cutting of the top strap of revolvers when shooting cartridges loaded with 110 and 125 grain bullets, Ruger discontinued their revolver in this cartridge after a short production run. Dan Wesson provided a second barrel to customers, but this failed to address customer fears, and the cartridge remained popular only in the single-shot T/C Contender. Remington then dropped this cartridge from production, although brass is still manufactured for reloaders every few years.

.375 SuperMag
Based on the .375 Winchester rifle cartridge, this custom round was meant to fit between the .357 SuperMag and the .445 SuperMag, but is no longer produced. It had a tapered case that was prone to sticking in the cylinder after firing. The .375 Super Mag took a special jacketed revolver bullet of 220 grains made by Hornady and chambered in the Dan Wesson revolver. But shooters concluded the combination did not shoot very well, and it was dropped from production with few being made. Star-Line brass is likewise rare.

.414 SuperMag
Based on the .41 Magnum cartridge, the .414 SuperMag never really caught on, partly due to a medium range performance that was not that different to the well-established .44 Magnum. Consequently, the cartridge was never adopted by any of the major commercial ammunition producers, although custom ammunition producers listed it, loaded with Starline brass. Dan Wesson did commence chambering their 8” barrelled, heavy frame revolver for it in 2000, the numbers were small, due to lack of demand and terminated by their Chapter 11 bankruptcy. They also offered ‘factory’ .414 Super Mag ammunition, based upon Starline cases topped with a 220-grain TC bullet, now highly collectable itself. Thompson Center were the only other manufacturer to catalogue the calibre, offering various lengths of chambered barrel for their single-shot T/C Contender. A revolver designed for the .414 SuperMag can also fire the shorter .41 Magnum and the .41 Special cartridges.

.445 SuperMag
Based on the .44 Magnum cartridge, the .445 SuperMag is a high pressure cartridge and will allow higher muzzle velocities than most .44 Magnum cartridges. .445 cartridges are designed for long range hunting and target revolvers. Capable of knock-down performance surpassing 200 yards for Silhouette and 150 yards for hunting applications. The .445 Super Magnum can drive a heavy 300 grain bullet 120 ft/sec faster than the .44 Magnum cartridge. While Dan Wesson handguns in .445 SuperMag ceased production in 2007, custom ammunition producers like Buffalo Bore continue to offer loaded ammunition. Starline brass is still available and custom manufacturers occasionally offer T/C Encore barrels. A revolver designed for the .445 SuperMag can also fire the shorter .44 Magnum, .44 Special, and the .44 Russian cartridges.

References

 Taffin, John.  The SuperMags  SixGuns.com
 Taffin, John.  Taffin Tests: The .445 SuperMag  SixGuns.com

Cartridge families
Magnum pistol cartridges